Stevie Cameron, (Stephanie Graham Dahl; born 11 October 1943) is a Canadian investigative journalist and author.

Early life and work
Stephanie "Stevie" Graham Dahl was born in Belleville, Ontario, to Harold Edward Dahl, a mercenary American pilot who fought in the Spanish Republican Air Force during the Spanish Civil War.

She has an honours B.A. in English from the University of British Columbia, and attended graduate school at University College London, England, for three years.

Career
She worked for the Department of External Affairs in Ottawa in the 1960s, and taught English literature at Trent University.

After a year at Le Cordon Bleu Cooking School in Paris in 1975, she began working as a food writer and in 1977, became the food editor of the Toronto Star. A year later, she moved to the Ottawa Journal as Lifestyles editor. She later became the Ottawa Citizen's Lifestyles and Travel editor. Four years later, she joined a new investigative journalism unit at the Citizen and also became a national political columnist.

Personal life
Cameron lives in Toronto with her husband, David Cameron, a professor at the University of Toronto. They have two daughters, who are both screenwriters.

Major works
In 1986, Cameron moved to Toronto as a national columnist and reporter for The Globe and Mail, and published her first book, in 1989, called Ottawa Inside Out. In 1990 she became a host of the CBC Television public affairs program The Fifth Estate but returned to the Globe in 1991 as a freelance columnist and feature writer.

Cameron, Brian Mulroney, and the Airbus Affair
Her second book, On the Take: Crime, Corruption and Greed in the Mulroney Years, was published in 1994. The book raised questions about the ethics of former Progressive Conservative Prime Minister Brian Mulroney and his alleged involvement in secret commissions paid by Karlheinz Schreiber to members of the Government of Canada, and to Conservative-linked lobbyists, in exchange for then-crown corporation Air Canada's purchase of 34 Airbus jets. It was one of the first full-length works to dig into the Airbus Affair in Canada. The book also documented several other corruption scandals during the period. In 1995, Cameron joined Maclean's magazine as a contributor for investigative stories.

Cameron became the focus of a campaign by Brian Mulroney's defenders to discredit the allegations against him. In 2004, The Globe and Mail turned the tables on its former investigative reporter by running a series of three articles by lawyer William Kaplan, claiming that Cameron had worked as a confidential informant for the Royal Canadian Mounted Police during its investigation of the Airbus Affair. Cameron vigorously denied the allegations, which, if true, would have compromised her credibility as a journalist. In his 2004 book A Secret Trial: Brian Mulroney, Stevie Cameron and the Public Trust, Kaplan outlined evidence that illustrated the RCMP's perception of Cameron as a confidential RCMP informant. But in the spring of 2005 (in testimony in the Eurocopter trial, held in Toronto before Judge Edward Then), Chief Superintendent Al Matthews, the RCMP officer in charge of the Airbus investigation, recanted almost all of the allegations against Cameron contained in a search warrant that had been relied upon by Kaplan. Matthews admitted that Cameron had very few contacts with the RCMP, contradicting assertions he'd made in court that she had possessed several hundred. He also admitted that Cameron was telling the truth when she said any information she had shared with the RCMP was already in the public domain, and that the information she shared was of little help to their investigation.

On 14 February 2007, Cameron appeared before the House of Commons of Canada Ethics Committee in their examination of the Mulroney Airbus Settlement. She confirmed that everything she knows on the subject had been documented in her books. Cameron also made a personal statement that she was not a police informant; any information she had given to the RCMP was already in the public domain at the time.

Cameron was subpoenaed by the Oliphant Commission as a potential witness for the public inquiry called by Prime Minister Stephen Harper in early 2008, under terms defined by David Lloyd Johnston. Ultimately, Cameron was not called as a witness when the inquiry, chaired by Justice Jeffrey Oliphant (former Associate Chief Justice of the Supreme Court of Manitoba) got going in Ottawa. Ultimately, it was conclusively demonstrated by the Oliphant Inquiry that Mulroney had received at least $225,000 from Schreiber, in three equal instalments, in cash, paid in thousand-dollar bills, shortly after leaving office in mid-1993. Two of these cash-transfer meetings took place in Montreal, while the third occurred at the luxury Pierre Hotel in New York City. Mulroney had earlier denied any business dealings whatsoever with Schreiber, and had denied receiving any money from him, as a response to questions during his lawsuit testimony given in 1996 in Montreal. Mulroney had delayed paying income tax on this money until several years after he received it.

Blue Trust, 1998
In 1998, she published her third book, Blue Trust,. The book profiled the bizarre life and death of Bruce Verchere, a Montreal tax lawyer and partner in the national law firm Bennett Jones LLP, who had served as private financial advisor to Mulroney, before committing suicide in late summer 1993. Verchere had left his wife, a very successful entrepreneur, for an affair with the much younger Diane Hailey, daughter of novelist Arthur Hailey, a Verchere client. Just before his suicide, Verchere had been appointed as chairman of Atomic Energy of Canada Limited.

The following year, she founded Elm Street, a national general-interest magazine, but continued to write investigative features for Maclean's. Three years later, she resigned from Elm Street, continuing as a columnist, in order to research and write The Last Amigo, with co-author Harvey Cashore; this 2001 book is a biography of Schreiber, along with a more detailed examination of the Airbus Affair. It won a Crime Writers of Canada award as the Best True Crime Book of the Year.

Books on Robert Pickton
She began researching the Robert Pickton murder case in British Columbia in 2002, and published her first book on the case, The Pickton File, in 2007. Cameron has completed her second book about the Pickton case, On the Farm: Robert William Pickton and the Tragic Story of Vancouver’s Missing Women, which was published by Knopf in the summer of 2010 when a publication ban on the case was lifted after an appeal to Supreme Court of Canada upheld the trial jury's guilty verdict. As well as documenting the botched police investigation that finally led to Pickton's arrest, the book contains important insights into why Pickton offered help to some of the woman he picked up as prostitutes, while brutally murdering others, and how he decided who he would kill. On the Farm was nominated for the 2011 Charles Taylor Prize and won the 2011 Arthur Ellis Award for best non-fiction crime book.

Other work
Cameron has also been a contributing editor to Maclean's magazine, a monthly columnist and a contributor to the Toronto Star, The Ottawa Citizen, the Southam News Service, Saturday Night magazine, the Financial Post, Chatelaine, and Canadian Living.

Cameron has lectured on journalism schools across the country, and in 2008, she spent the fall term as Irving Chair in Media at St. Thomas University's journalism school in Fredericton.

In 2012, she was writing a history of Kingston Penitentiary.

Humanitarian work
Cameron serves on the board of Second Harvest in Toronto as well as on the board of Portland Place, an assisted housing project for homeless and underhoused people. In 1991 she helped found an Out of the Cold program for the homeless at her church, St. Andrew's, in downtown Toronto, and has worked with many churches across Canada to set up similar programs. In 2004, she received an honorary Doctor of Divinity from the Vancouver School of Theology, in part for her work with the homeless.

In recognition of more than two-decades of humanitarian work and social activism, Cameron was awarded the Order of Canada in December 2012. Her citation reads: "For her achievements in investigative journalism and for her volunteer work on behalf of the disadvantaged."

Bibliography

Non-fiction
 Ottawa Inside Out (1989) 
 On the Take: Crime, Corruption and Greed in the Mulroney Years (1994) 
 Blue Trust: The Author, the Lawyer, His Wife and Her Money (1998) 
 The Last Amigo: Karlheinz Schreiber and the Anatomy of a Scandal (2001) (with Harvey Cashore). 
 The Pickton File (2007) Knopf Canada. 
 On the Farm: Robert William Pickton and the Tragic Story of Vancouver's Missing Women (2010)

Awards
 2011 Arthur Ellis Award for On The Farm, Best Crime Non-Fiction Book of the Year
 2008 Irving Chair in Media, St. Thomas University, September–November 2008
 2004 Honorary Doctorate of Divinity and convocation speaker, Vancouver School of Theology at UBC, for journalism and work with the homeless, Vancouver (3 May 2004)
 2003 Honorary Diploma & Commencement speaker, Loyalist College of Applied Arts and Technology, Belleville, June 2003, for journalism and community work
 2003 City of Toronto Community Service Award for work with the homeless
 2002 Arthur Ellis Award (Crime Writers' of Canada) for The Last Amigo, Best Crime Non-Fiction Book of the Year (with Harvey Cashore)
 1998 Business Book of the Year Merit Award for Blue Trust
 1998 Windsor Press Club: Golden Quill Award for journalism
 1995 Periodical Marketers’ Awards: Book of the Year & Author of the Year, for On the Take
 1988 Centre for Investigative Journalism Award honorable mention for a 1987 story in The Globe and Mail about the amounts the PC Canada fund paid for decorating the prime minister's residence.

References

External links
 Regret the Error: Stevie Cameron corrects The Globe Text of Cameron's letter to the editor responding to the Globe'''s allegations that she was an RCMP informant.
  2003 article in the '"Catholic New Times profiling Cameron's work on the issue of homelessness.
 Stevie Cameron official Twitter page
 Author interview, online from CBC Words at Large
 Stevie Cameron online interview with THECOMMENTARY.CA, June 2007

1943 births
Living people
Canadian newspaper journalists
Canadian Presbyterians
University of British Columbia alumni
Canadian television journalists
Canadian magazine journalists
Journalists from Ontario
Writers from Belleville, Ontario
Canadian women television journalists
Canadian investigative journalists
Canadian political journalists
20th-century Canadian journalists
21st-century Canadian journalists
20th-century Canadian women writers
Centre for Investigative Journalism Award winners
20th-century Canadian non-fiction writers
21st-century Canadian non-fiction writers
Canadian women non-fiction writers
21st-century Canadian women writers